Thomas Holt (14 November 1811 – 5 September 1888) was an English-born Australian pastoralist, company director and politician. He was a member of the New South Wales Legislative Council between 1868 and 1883. He was also a member of the New South Wales Legislative Assembly for two periods between 1856 and 1857 and again between 1861 and 1864. Holt was the first Colonial Treasurer in New South Wales.

Early life
Holt, born in Horbury, Yorkshire, England in November 1811, was the son of Thomas Holt Snr. a Yorkshire wool merchant and Elizabeth Ellis and was educated in Wakefield. He initially worked in his father's firm in Leeds but after 3 years became a wool buyer in London. Subsequently, Holt emigrated to Sydney in 1842 and made a fortune as a wool merchant. He was also a director of numerous colonial companies including the Sydney Railway Company. As a result, he was independently wealthy and retired from active business in 1855.

After building a gothic stone mansion, "The Warren", on land overlooking the Cooks River in Marrickville, Holt stocked the grounds with imported European rabbits for breeding and hunting, alpacas, llamas and salmon. Holt also had an extensive estate in the Sans Souci area of Sydney. In later life he was a founder of Royal Prince Alfred Hospital, a member of the Royal Society of New South Wales and a patron of the Royal Agricultural Society of New South Wales.

Colonial Parliament
Holt was unsuccessful at two attempts to enter the Legislative Council prior to the establishment of responsible self-government in 1856. However, at the first election under the new constitution he was elected to the Legislative Assembly as one of the two members for Stanley Boroughs (including Brisbane and Ipswich) which, prior to the establishment of Queensland as a separate colony in 1859, was part of New South Wales. At the next election in 1858, Holt was defeated in an attempt to transfer to the seat of Cumberland (South Riding). He re-entered the Assembly as the member for Newtown at an 1861 by-election caused by the resignation of Alexander McArthur but resigned from the seat before the next election in 1864–65. In 1868 he accepted a life appointment to the Legislative Council.

Holt was a supporter of free-trade and had a liberal political philosophy. Throughout his political career he campaigned for education, gaol and immigration reform and spent a small fortune supporting Henry Parkes' "Empire" newspaper. An active Congregationalist, in 1864 he gave half the value of his residence, Camden Villa, towards the founding of Camden College (Congregational Church school).

Government
Holt was the third Colonial Treasurer and the first following the introduction of responsible government in New South Wales in 1856, serving in the liberal government of Stuart Donaldson. He held this position for 80 days.

Later life
In 1881 Thomas went back to England where he devoted himself to the poor of London, working with The Salvation Army, the Rev Andrew Mearns (author of 'The Bitter Cry of Outcast London: an inquiry into the abject poor'), and Dr Barnardo. He died at his home "Halcot" in Bexley, Kent, on 5 September, after completing his book, 'Christianity, or the Poor Man's Friend'; and was buried at Abney Park Cemetery.

Legacy
The Thomas Holt Retirement Villages in the south of Sydney are named after him.

References

 

1811 births
1888 deaths
Members of the New South Wales Legislative Assembly
Members of the New South Wales Legislative Council
Treasurers of New South Wales
Burials at Abney Park Cemetery
19th-century Australian politicians